Rainbow Falls is the highest waterfall on the Middle Fork of the San Joaquin River, in the eastern Sierra Nevada mountains of California, in the United States. Plunging  to the turbulent water below, the falls are named for the rainbows that appear in their mist on sunny summer days. Rainbow Falls is located within the boundaries of Devils Postpile National Monument.

About 75,000 years ago, lava erupted from a vent just east of the present-day falls. The eruption occurred in two stages. The first pulse of lava flowed about  westward and pooled in the Middle Fork of the San Joaquin drainage. The second pulse of lava insulated the first, allowing it to cool slowly and to fracture vertically. The layer above cooled under different conditions and fractured horizontally. Geologists describe these rocks as platy rhyodacite; they are visible in the cliffs that surround Rainbow Falls.

As water rushes over the cliff, it erodes the vertically fractured rhyodacite more easily. A small cavern begins to form at the base of the falls, and the overlying rock loses its support and collapses. This process, known as undercutting, causes the waterfall to recede slowly upstream. To date Rainbow Falls has retreated about  due to undercutting.

References

Landforms of Madera County, California
Waterfalls of California
Plunge waterfalls